Southern Pacific Terminal Co. v. ICC, 219 U.S. 498 (1911), was a United States Supreme Court decision that held that while normally, in order for the court to hear a case, there must still be a controversy outstanding, when the issue was such that it would be of short duration, and would most likely become moot before appellate review could take place, and that the issue was likely to reoccur, then the court could hear the issue.

Issue
A division of the Southern Pacific Railroad was aiding a cottonseed exporter in the Port of Galveston by negotiating discount wharf fees on his behalf in exchange for requiring farmers to haul the crop exclusively in Southern Pacific railcars.  When the Interstate Commerce Commission challenged the arrangement as anti-competitive, the contract was terminated but the ICC felt similar product tying would reoccur once the case was dismissed as moot.

The court's decision
The court referred to this condition as, 

This condition, known as "capable of repetition, yet evading review," has allowed the court to take cases which it otherwise would be unable to decide upon, because the appellant would otherwise have no grounds to appeal.  This issue has become important in a number of areas including First Amendment cases involving press coverage of trials, and to statutes involving abortion.

See also
 Hartsville Oil Mill v. United States: military cotton contracts
 Ware & Leland v. Mobile County: federal jurisdiction on cotton futures
 List of United States Supreme Court cases, volume 219

References

External links
 

United States Supreme Court cases
United States Supreme Court cases of the White Court
1911 in United States case law
Interstate Commerce Commission litigation
Southern Pacific Railroad
Cotton industry in the United States
History of Galveston, Texas
Railway litigation in 1911
Cottonseed oil